The prickly deep-sea skate (Brochiraja spinifera), or spiny deep-sea skate, is a skate in the family Arhynchobatidae. It lives off New Zealand, at depths of from 170 to 1,400 m on the continental shelf. Their length is from 60 to 80 cm.

Conservation status 
The New Zealand Department of Conservation classifies the prickly deep-sea skate as "Data deficient" under the New Zealand Threat Classification System.

References

Rajidae
Endemic marine fish of New Zealand
Fish described in 1974